Sami Sandell (born March 1, 1987) from Nokia, Finland is a Finnish professional ice hockey player who is currently playing for HC Davos of the National League (NL). He previously played for Ilves Tampere of the Finnish League.

Sandell joined Davos in July 2018 on a tryout, before officially joining the team on a one year-deal worth CHF 550,000 on August 17, 2018.

References

External links

1987 births
Living people
Finnish ice hockey left wingers
Luleå HF players
Ilves players
People from Nokia, Finland
Sportspeople from Pirkanmaa